Gem-associated protein 8 (Gemin-8) is a protein that in humans is encoded by the GEMIN8 gene.

Function 

Gemin-8 is part of the SMN complex, which is necessary for spliceosomal snRNP assembly in the cytoplasm and pre-mRNA splicing in the nucleus. Gemin-8 binds to both SMN1 and the GEMIN6 / GEMIN7 heterodimer, mediating their interaction. This protein is found in nuclear Gemini of Cajal bodies (gems) and in the cytoplasm. Three transcript variants encoding the same protein have been found for this gene.

References

Further reading